Earl Marriott Secondary (EMS) is a public high school in the Vancouver suburb of Surrey, British Columbia, Canada and is part of School District 36 Surrey.  It is referred to as the 'Home of the Mariners'. It is located on the edge of city limits, on 16th Avenue (which straddles the border between Surrey and White Rock).

History 
Originally White Rock Secondary School, Earl Marriott Secondary was founded in 1973 and named after its first Principal, Earl Marriott, who eventually became Superintendent of Surrey School District #36.

Earl Marriott has a close relationship with the Semiahmoo First Nation community. The institution has a history and custom of cooperation with First Nation peoples; the school hosts an annual Pow Wow and students have visited Haida Gwaii to engage in cultural sharing.

EMS puts on either a play or musical out of the indwelling Wheelhouse Theatre every year (on a rotational basis; ie: play, musical, play, etc.).

Academics 
Earl Marriott is one of four French immersion high schools in Surrey and offers full course loads in both French and English. About 25 per cent of students are French immersion and attend from across the Semiahmoo Peninsula.

Earl Marriott offers courses including physical education, all major humanities and sciences as well as art, home economics, info tech, and trades courses. It is one of few schools that offer competitive co-op experiences for its students. Earl Marriott offers a liberal arts co-op, as well as a mechanical (skilled trades) co-op. EMS also offers 3 Advanced Placement (AP) classes: AP Psychology, AP Calculus AB, and AP Statistics.

Earl Marriott has two semesters per school year (2022-2023). A full load of classes would consist of four classes per semester.

Athletics 

EMS enjoys a publicly lighthearted rivalry with Semiahmoo Secondary School, but fierce within student circles and even some staff members, as well as Elgin Park Secondary School.
The school competes in the Sandcastle Cup, an annual game between the Mariners and Semiahmoo Secondary School Thunderbirds. 
 Boys 2000-2001 AAA Provincial Cross Country Champions
 Girls 2002-2003 AAA Provincial Basketball Champions
 Home of the AAAA Sr. Girls Volleyball Provincial Championships
 2009 Sandcastle Cup Runner-up
 2009 Skills Canada Champion - Web Design
 2009 Delta Police Golf Tournament Winners
2010 Fraser Valley Sr. boys AAA rugby
2010 Delta Police Golf Tournament winners
2010 Sandcastle Cup Runner-up
2014 AA Tier 2 Football Champion (first championship in school's 10 years of football)
2015 AA Tier 2 Football Champion (played at BC Place)
2016 Provincial Girls Track and Field Champions
2016 Provincial Junior Girls Volleyball Champions
2017 AA Undefeated Football Champions Grade 8
2018 Provincial Girls Curling Champions
2018 Senior Boys Volleyball Provincial Champions
2021 Grade 9 Girls Volleyball Provincial Champions
2022 Junior Girls Volleyball Provincial Champions

Wheelhouse Theatre 
The Wheelhouse Theatre is a 280-seat proscenium theater located at Earl Marriott Secondary School. It is the largest performing arts theatre on the Semiahmoo Peninsula. The Wheelhouse's primary usage is as a classroom and training facility for students pursuing theatre, and its secondary usage is as a well-equipped and affordable rental house to the community. It is managed by the school and its Theatre Department Head, Candace Radcliffe, as well as by the Wheelhouse Theatre Society, a collaboration of community volunteers mandated to raise funds for, and contribute necessary equipment purchases to, the theatre. 2022's production of She Kills Monsters marked the 45th year of major theatre production of Earl Marriott Theatre Company.

Notable alumni 
Colten Teubert, professional ice hockey player
 Andrew Hammond, professional ice hockey player
Jim Mullin, Canadian broadcaster
Gigi Guerrero, horror-movie director
Glenn Wool, stand-up comedian

References

External links 

School Reports - Ministry of Education
 Class Size
 Satisfaction Survey
 School Performance
 Skills Assessment

Buildings and structures in Surrey, British Columbia
French-language schools in British Columbia
High schools in Surrey, British Columbia
High schools in British Columbia
School buildings completed in 1973
Educational institutions established in 1973
1973 establishments in British Columbia